Nizhny Reutets is a rural locality and the administrative center of Nizhnereutchansky Selsoviet Rural Settlement, Medvensky District, Kursk Oblast, Russia. Population:

Geography 
The village is located on the Reutets River (a left tributary of the Reut River in the Seym basin), 57 km from the Russia–Ukraine border, 38 km south-west of Kursk, 6.5 km south-west of the district center – the urban-type settlement Medvenka.

 Climate
Nizhny Reutets has a warm-summer humid continental climate (Dfb in the Köppen climate classification).

Transport 

The rural locality is situated 45 km from Kursk Vostochny Airport, 89 km from Belgorod International Airport and 227 km from Voronezh Peter the Great Airport.

Born in the selo 
 Konstantin Dmitrievich Vorobyov (1919–1975) – a Soviet writer, a war hero and a major exponent of the lieutenant prose movement in the Soviet war literature.

References

Notes

Sources

Rural localities in Medvensky District